Garcinia forbesii, commonly known as the rose kandis or just kandis, is a small to medium-sized tree in the family Clusiaceae or Guttiferae. The specific epithet (forbesii) honors Scottish naturalist Henry Ogg Forbes.

Distribution
Garcinia forbesii is found in Southeast Asia and is native to Indonesia, Malaysia, Brunei, Papua New Guinea, Singapore, and southern Thailand.

Description
The trunk is straight and the foliage is dense, often concealing the trunk with branches appearing relatively close to the ground. It is a dioecious species with leathery, elliptically shaped evergreen leaves, and a yellow latex is produced in the inner bark of the tree. The pungent flowers are nocturnal and four-petaled, and in males are crimson in color and occur in clusters while in females are red or orange and occur solitarily. They are insect-pollinated.

Chemistry
Several xanthones have been isolated from the branches of Garcinia forbesii: known compounds pyranojacareubin and 1,3,7-trihydroxy-23-methylbut-2-enyl-xanthone, lichexanthone, as well as a new chromenoxanthone, forbexanthone.

Uses
The fruit is sometimes gathered and eaten raw.

Conservation status
In Singapore, the species is listed as critically endangered.

See also
List of Garcinia species

References

forbesii
Flora of tropical Asia
Plants described in 1890
Taxa named by George King (botanist)
Fruits originating in Asia
Fruit trees
Edible fruits